Francisco "Frankie" Lim (born February 29, 1960) is a Filipino former basketball player, basketball coach and executive. He played 15 seasons in the PBA.

He later became a successful coach, leading his alma mater San Beda Red Lions to four NCAA seniors titles. Lim is currently the coach of the NLEX Road Warriors.

Playing career

Lim played collegiate ball at San Beda College where he was a member of the last championship team that won the NCAA crown in 1978 (it was then followed by a 28-year title drought that ended in 2006). While in the amateur ranks, he suited up for YCO Painters in the old MICAA, which was then coached by Freddie Webb. He was part of the Philippine training team of coach Ron Jacobs in 1981 that took home the Jones Cup title. 

He turned pro in 1982 and was signed by Yco-Tanduay. Lim moved to Great Taste in his third season and won his first championship with the Coffee Makers. He spent most of the 1985 PBA season with knee problems and on the injured list. In 1986, he was acquired by new team Alaska Milkmen and Lim shared playmaker roles with Marte Saldaña and later on with Ric-Ric Marata. He was the last from the original Alaska roster to leave the squad in 1993 when he transferred to Purefoods. Lim won two championships with the Hotdogs before playing his final two seasons with Shell and San Miguel.

Coaching career

After retiring as a player, Lim was named an assistant of Eric Altamirano in Purefoods in 1997. Two years later, Altamirano moved to Talk 'N Text; Lim declined to be named interim coach as he wanted his first coaching stint to be a permanent one; he joined Altamirano in Talk 'N Text instead. With a change in management, the entire coaching staff was fired, but new owner Manuel V. Pangilinan later hired him as team manager of the team.

Lim then coached the San Beda Red Lions in the NCAA, where he won four titles with the school in 2007, 2008, 2010, and 2011. In 2010, his team posted an immaculate record of 18-0 by sweeping all its opponents from the eliminations to the finals.
 
In 2012, he resigned, just before he was set to serve a two-year ban from the NCAA for getting involved in a brawl with then San Sebastian College-Recoletos volleyball head coach Roger Gorayeb.

In 2013, he briefly left the Philippines to coach Stadium Jakarta in Indonesia's National Basketball League.

In January 2015, he joined Ginebra as an assistant coach to Ato Agustin. After the team suffered another early exit in the 2015 PBA Commissioner's Cup, he was appointed head coach of the Gin Kings, replacing Agustin.

In June 2015, Lim was fined and suspended for striking out at Calvin Abueva. Abueva clashed with Orlando Johnson after a heated play, before LA Tenorio shoved Abueva hard who fell close to Lim, who seemed to lash out. The Philippine Basketball Association suspended Lim for a game, also well as giving him a fine along with Abueva, Johnson, and Tenorio for their respective roles in the incident.

In late 2017, Lim returned to the NCAA after being named as basketball consultant of the Perpetual Altas; this was reportedly after the league lifted its suspension against Lim. A month later, he was appointed head coach of the Altas. With the onset of the COVID-19 pandemic, University of Perpetual Help System DALTA shut down its athletic program, suspending contracts of its coaches, including Lim's. He subsequently resigned after leading the Altas to the semifinals in his first year, only to finish with a losing record in the next season.

In 2022, the NLEX Road Warriors appointed Lim as their head coach, after then coach Yeng Guiao declined the management's offer of him taking a corporate role instead of coaching. Lim is set to serve his PBA suspension from his last stint with Ginebra in 2015 on the Abueva incident on his supposed first game on charge at NLEX.

Coaching style 
He is best known as a disciplinarian who employs the run-and-gun system.

Personal life 
Lim is married to Olen Juarez-Lim, a former model and a public speaker. Frankie and Olen had three children, including Miakka, a one-time volleyball player for the De La Salle Lady Spikers and courtside reporter in the PBA TV coverage, and Melo, who Frankie coached at San Beda. Lim also considered his import player Sudan Daniel as an adopted son, and mourned his in death in 2020.

Coaching record

Collegiate record

Professional record

NBL Indonesia

PBA

References

External links

1960 births
Living people
Filipino men's basketball coaches
Philippines men's national basketball team players
Filipino men's basketball players
Basketball players from Manila
San Beda Red Lions basketball players
Tanduay Rhum Masters players
Great Taste Coffee Makers players
Alaska Aces (PBA) players
Magnolia Hotshots players
Shell Turbo Chargers players
San Miguel Beermen players
Magnolia Hotshots coaches
TNT Tropang Giga coaches
San Beda Red Lions basketball coaches
Barangay Ginebra San Miguel coaches
Perpetual Altas basketball coaches
NLEX Road Warriors coaches
Filipino expatriate basketball people in Indonesia